Tshaneni Airfield  is an airstrip serving Tshaneni, in Eswatini.

See also

Transport in Eswatini
List of airports in Eswatini

References

External links
 OurAirports - Tshaneni
 FallingRain - Tshaneni

 Google Earth

Airports in Eswatini